Collège Mont La Salle (MLS) is a French international school in Ain Saadeh, Lebanon. It serves from toute petite section through terminale (final year of lycée or senior high school/sixth form college).

History 
The Collège des Frères Mont La Salle (MLS) is located in the Metn coastline and occupies one of the great hills of the village of Ain Saadé, overlooking the city of Beirut and the Mediterranean Sea in the middle of a forest of pine trees, at an altitude about 400 meters.

The architecturally modern school complex opened its doors on October 10, 1972, to accommodate 1,972 students, from the 4th grade classes to the Terminale (senior high-school), from the 3 colleges of the Brothers of the region: Sacred Heart Gemmayze, Notre-Dame Furn el Chebbak and the Ecole Sainte Marie Beit-Mery.

During the tragic civil war events experienced by Lebanon, the college was targeted by both sides. In October 1991, the school opened the Institute of Electronics, with the financial assistance from the European Community. Its goal: to prepare superior technicians  with the ability and competence to contribute to the reconstruction of Lebanon. The Collège des Frères Mont La Salle is a school institution founded according to the Lebanese ministerial decree N ° 4004 of September 25, 1972. It is an "open institution" because, while displaying as a catholic establishment, faithful to its origins, it welcomes the young people from all walks of life and from all faiths. The training it gives revolves around the opening of the minds of young people to respect the major cultural and spiritual currents. While being trilingual, teaching is rooted particularly in the Arab and French cultures. The teaching of English is thorough; the large number of students who are regularly admitted to continue their studies in English-speaking universities is a striking proof of this.

The Collège des Frères Mont La Salle is now approved by the French Ministry of National Education, Higher Education and Research. Today, it runs all courses up to Lebanese and French baccalaureate, as well as technical education in electronics, computer science and accounting, with more than 250 teachers and more than 2,800 students.

References

External links
 Collège Mont La Salle 

Matn District
French international schools in Lebanon